Rude Squad is an American ska punk band founded in St. Petersburg, Florida, United States, in 1997. The final and longest running band line up are: Eric Best (vocals & guitar), Lee McElhaney (sax), Rusch Young (trumpet), Kyle Sokol (bass), and Adrian Baptist (drums). Rude Squad have cited Fishbone, The Toasters, Goldfinger and The Police as inspirations for their work. They are the longest running active ska band in the Tampa Bay area according to Creative Loafing.

Rude Squad has formed their own legacy by playing as a subset, using the sax, guitar, drums, trumpet and lethal vocals as the combination needed to create the elements in the ska genre. They have performed with multiple bands such as Rancid, the Skatalites, Suicide Machines, the Used, The Pietasters, Voodoo Glow Skulls, Matisyahu, and 311. They have also taken part and participated in events throughout the state and beyond such as Vans Warped Tour '04, 97X's Next Big Thing, 98 Rock's Livestock, and numerous local events throughout the Bay area. Rude Squad signed a record deal with Octave Match Records in 2010.

Rude Squad has reformed after their recent reunion show on November 23, 2013 to a sold out crowd at the Local 662 in their hometown of St. Petersburg, Florida. Rude Squad also signed to Citrus Records on 16 October 2014 after being released from their old contract with Octave Match Records.

Band line-up

Current Line-Up
Lee McElhaney - Sax (The New Rulers)
Rusch Young - Trumpet
Kyle Sokol - Bass (Trace Of Day, Trust For Liars, Blackkout, Messiaxx, Eric Best Solo)
Eric Best - Vocals, Guitar (Brosef Skalin, Solo)
Adrian Baptist - Drums (Pig Pen, Slade and the Wasters)

Former members
Steve De Cosmo - Back-up Vocals
Chip Manger - Bass
Alex Trellu - Bass
Paul De Cosmo - Drums
Matt Hollingsworth - Drums
Alden Kooken - Sax
Jason Rodriguez - Drums

Discography
Self Titled EP - 2000
No Practice - 2002
Unwrapped - 2004
On the Edge of Failure - Octave Match Records - 2010
Closer Than You - Florida Ska Compilation - Citrus records - 2014

References

Other sources
 Rude Squad with Voodoo Glow Skulls co-headlining show "Rude Squad with VooDoo Glow Skulls" September 26, 2017.
 Official Press Release for Rude Squad Record Deal Signing "Official Press Release Rude Squad Signs Record Contract" March 10, 2010.
 Closer Than You Florida Ska Compilation featuring Rude Squad  2014

External links

Articles
 Rude Squad Reunion Show! from State Theatre Concerts
 Rude Squad at the Free for All from Tampa Bay Online
 Great Music You've Never Heard from The St. Pete Crew
 Floridian: In Your Own Backyard from The St. Pete Times
 Creative Loafing: Rudesquad takes it to the Edge, St. Pete ska-punks release fourth CD from Creative Loafing

American ska punk musical groups
Third-wave ska groups
Punk rock groups from Florida
Musical groups from Tampa, Florida
American ska musical groups
1997 establishments in Florida